Fiona's tube-nosed bat (Murina fionae) is a species of vesper bats (Vespertilionidae). It is found in Vietnam, Cambodia, and Laos.

References

Murininae
Mammals of Vietnam
Mammals of Cambodia
Mammals of Laos
Bats of Southeast Asia
Mammals described in 2012